Stefan Weber may refer to:

Steven Weber (actor) (born 1961), American actor
Stefan Weber (media researcher) (born 1970), Austrian scientist
Stefan Weber (musician) (1946–2018), Austrian musician and composer
Stefan Weber (Orientalist) (born 1967), German Islamicist